Gemmula murrayi is a species of sea snail, a marine gastropod mollusk in the family Turridae, the turrids.

Description
The length of the shell varies between 35 mm and 40 mm.

Distribution
This marine species occurs in the Gulf of Oman and in the Persian Gulf; also in the Gulf of Carpentaria, Australia.

References

 Powell, A.W.B. 1964. The Family Turridae in the Indo-Pacific. Part 1. The Subfamily Turrinae. Indo-Pacific Mollusca 1: 227-346 
 Long, B. G., and I. R. Poiner. "Infaunal benthic community structure and function in the Gulf of Carpentaria, northern Australia." Marine and Freshwater Research 45.3 (1994): 293-316.

External links
  Tucker, J.K. 2004 Catalog of recent and fossil turrids (Mollusca: Gastropoda). Zootaxa 682:1-1295.

murrayi
Gastropods described in 1964